Steven Charles Furniss (born December 21, 1952) is an American former swimmer, Olympic medalist and former world record-holder.  At the 1972 Summer Olympics in Munich, Germany, he won the bronze medal in the men's 200-meter individual medley. He attended Foothill High School in Santa Ana, California.  His brother Bruce Furniss also competed as an Olympic swimmer.

Furniss studied business at University of Southern California, but then worked in public relations for the swimwear company Arena. , he is the executive vice president of the swimsuit company TYR, which Furniss co-founded.

See also
 List of Olympic medalists in swimming (men)
 List of University of Southern California people
 List of World Aquatics Championships medalists in swimming (men)
 World record progression 200 metres individual medley
 World record progression 4 × 200 metres freestyle relay

References

1952 births
Living people
American male medley swimmers
World record setters in swimming
Olympic bronze medalists for the United States in swimming
Pan American Games gold medalists for the United States
Sportspeople from Madison, Wisconsin
Swimmers at the 1971 Pan American Games
Swimmers at the 1972 Summer Olympics
Swimmers at the 1975 Pan American Games
USC Trojans men's swimmers
World Aquatics Championships medalists in swimming
Medalists at the 1972 Summer Olympics
Pan American Games medalists in swimming
Universiade medalists in swimming
Universiade silver medalists for the United States
Medalists at the 1973 Summer Universiade
Medalists at the 1971 Pan American Games
Medalists at the 1975 Pan American Games
20th-century American people